Richard Davis Hearney (born November 27, 1939) is a retired United States Marine Corps four-star general who served as the Assistant Commandant of the Marine Corps from 1994 to 1996.

Biography 
Hearney is a native of Petaluma, California. He was commissioned a second lieutenant in 1962 following completion of the Platoon Leaders Class program. He holds a B.S. degree from Stanford University and an M.S. degree from Pepperdine University. He graduated from the Naval War College in June 1980.

Hearney commanded at the squadron, air group, and air wing level. During Desert Shield and Desert Storm he served as Deputy Commander, I MEF. His staff tours included Deputy Director, J-3, U.S. European Command as well as Deputy Chiefs of Staff for Requirements and Programs, and Aviation at Headquarters Marine Corps, Washington, D.C. General Hearney was advanced to general and assumed the position of assistant commandant on July 15, 1994.

General Hearney currently sits on the Honorary Board for the 501 (c) (3) Non Profit Wine Country Marines [1]

Awards and decorations 
His personal decorations and medals include:

References 

 Official biography

1939 births
Living people
People from Petaluma, California
United States Marine Corps generals
United States Marine Corps personnel of the Vietnam War
Recipients of the Legion of Merit
Recipients of the Distinguished Flying Cross (United States)
United States Naval Aviators
Stanford University alumni
Pepperdine University alumni
Assistant Commandants of the United States Marine Corps
Recipients of the Air Medal
Recipients of the Defense Superior Service Medal
Military in the San Francisco Bay Area
Military personnel from California